We're All Necessary (Spanish: Todos somos necesarios, Italian: Ritorno alla vita) is a 1956 Italian-Spanish drama film directed by José Antonio Nieves Conde, starring Alberto Closas, Folco Lulli, Lída Baarová and Ferdinand Anton. It tells the story of three men who are released from prison and have doubts and regrets regarding their place in society. The film was a co-production with an Italian company. It competed in the Spanish section at the 1956 San Sebastián International Film Festival, where it won the awards for Best Film, Best Director, Best Screenplay and Best Actor (Closas).

Cast
 Alberto Closas - An ex surgeon
 Folco Lulli - A thief
 Manuel Alexandre - The employee of the train
 Jose Marco Davo
 Ferdinand Anton
 Lída Baarová  - A secretary
 Francisco Bernal
 Rafael Calvo Revilla
 Rafael Durán
 Albert Hehn
 Josephine Kipper
 Rainer Penkert

References

Bibliography
 D'Lugo, Marvin. Guide to the Cinema of Spain. Greenwood Publishing, 1997.

External links 
 
 We're All Necessary at Variety Distribution

1956 drama films
1956 films
Films directed by José Antonio Nieves Conde
Spanish drama films
Italian drama films
1950s Spanish-language films
Films set on trains
Spanish black-and-white films
Italian black-and-white films
1950s Italian films